This is a round-up of the 1996 Sligo Intermediate Football Championship. Ballymote won their second title in four years after defeating Mullinabreena in the decider. At the end of this year the re-structuring of the adult grades saw the Intermediate grade reduced to ten teams, resulting in four teams being relegated from both League and Championship, namely St. Farnan's, Owenmore Gaels, St. Michael's and Maugherow, while the previous year's Junior champions, Tubbercurry, were also demoted.

James Kearins was the winning manager; he would later be appointed manager of the Sligo county team in 2003.

First round

Quarter finals

Semi-finals

Sligo Intermediate Football Championship Final

References

 Sligo Champion (Autumn 1996)

Sligo Intermediate Football Championship
Sligo Intermediate Football Championship